The Celestial Omnibus and Other Stories is the title of a collection of short stories by English writer E. M. Forster, first published in 1911. It contains stories written over the previous ten years, and together with the collection The Eternal Moment (1928) forms part of Forster's Collected Short Stories (1947).

Contents
The Celestial Omnibus contains:
 "The Story of a Panic"
 "The Other Side of the Hedge"
 "The Celestial Omnibus"
 "Other Kingdom"
 "The Curate's Friend"
 "The Road from Colonus"

External links
 
 

1911 short story collections
Short story collections by E. M. Forster
Fantasy short story collections
20th-century short stories
British short story collections
Sidgwick & Jackson books